
In basketball, a triple-double is defined as a performance in which one player accumulates a double-digit total in three of five positive statistical categories—points, rebounds, assists, steals, and blocked shots—in a game. The most common way for a player to achieve a triple-double is with points, rebounds, and assists, though on occasion players may record 10 or more steals or blocked shots in a game. Each player on this list has accomplished this feat at least five times in a National Collegiate Athletic Association (NCAA) Division I men's or women's game.

Individual scoring totals have been recognized as official NCAA statistics throughout what it calls the "modern era" of men's basketball, which it considers to have started with the 1937–38 season, the first without the center jump after each made basket. Individual rebounding was added in the 1950–51 season. Similarly, the NCAA has recognized the same statistics in women's basketball since it began sponsoring competition in that sport in the 1981–82 season. However, official recognition of the other possible components of the triple-double did not come until later. In men's basketball, the NCAA first kept individual assist totals in the 1950–51 season, but discontinued the practice after the 1951–52 season, not resuming until 1983–84. Blocked shots and steals became official men's statistics in 1985–86. In women's basketball, assists became an official Division I statistic in 1985–86, with blocks and steals following in 1987–88. Both the men's and women's lists include only triple-doubles that are officially recognized by the NCAA.

Through the 2021–22 season, the career record for triple-doubles in Division I men's basketball is held by BYU's Kyle Collinsworth with 12. On the women's Division I side, Sabrina Ionescu of Oregon holds the record with 26. The only active player with 5 or more triple-doubles is Caitlin Clark of Iowa, with 10 through March 5, 2023.

The only single program to have had more than one player record five or more career triple-doubles is the Iowa women's program, with Clark joined by Samantha Logic. The only other school to have had more than one player accomplish this feat is Saint Mary's, with Brian Shaw having split his college career between Saint Mary's and UC Santa Barbara, and Louella Tomlinson having played her entire college career at Saint Mary's.

Key

Men

Women

Current through games as of March 5, 2023.

Footnotes

References
General

Specific

NCAA Division I men's basketball statistical leaders
NCAA Division I women's basketball statistical leaders